Tuti Island (also spelled Tutti Island) is an island in Sudan where the White Nile and Blue Nile merge to form the main Nile. It is surrounded by the "Three Towns": Khartoum (the capital of Sudan), Omdurman (the largest city in Sudan), and Khartoum North (also known as Bahri, a large industrial center). Despite this, Tuti is home to only one small village (founded in the late 15th century), with grassland being the main makeup of the island. In the past the only approach to Tuti Island was via several ferries that cross the river intermittently, but the Tuti Bridge, a modern suspension bridge, was completed in 2008 and can be used instead.

Tuti Island is mainly agricultural and where Khartoum gets most of its supply of fruits and vegetables. Several farms are situated all around the island, many of them still using manual methods of farming. Green fields and lime groves are also present.

Lifestyle 

thumb|left|200px| Tuti island

Its eight square kilometres (three square miles) of fertile land are covered in citrus orchards, vegetable farms, gorse hedgerows and narrow muddy lanes where donkeys and rickshaws are the main source of transport.

The building of the Tuti Bridge has sparked development projects on Tuti Island, primarily by Tuti Island Investment Company, which plans to turn the Island into a state of the art tourist resort. These ideas have caused controversy, with the locals wishing to protect their village from becoming a tourist destination.

References

Khartoum
Omdurman
River islands of Sudan
Khartoum (state)
Islands of the Nile